Ledocarpaceae Meyen was a small flowering plant family of shrubs native to western South America. Under the APG III system of classification it is considered to be a part of the Vivianiaceae.

References

 in Stevens, P. F. (2001 onwards).

Geraniales
Rosid families
Historically recognized angiosperm families